al-Arishah is a town in southern al-Hasakah Governorate, northeastern Syria. It is administrative center of the Nahiya al-Arishah District, which consists of 20 municipalities.

During the 2004 census, al-Arishah had a population of 3,957.

References 

Populated places in al-Hasakah District